Guanyin Subdistrict is a subdistrict in Pengshan District, Meishan, Sichuan province, China. , it has six residential neighborhoods and three villages under its administration:
Neighborhoods
Caishan Community
Maodian Community
Longmenqiao Community
Xingchong Community
Wuhu Community
Guanyinpu Community

Villages
Chundian Village
Wenchang Village
Guoyuan Village

See also 
 List of township-level divisions of Sichuan

References 

Township-level divisions of Sichuan
Meishan